Charles Augustus Stevens, Jr. (July 10, 1918 – May 28, 2018) was an American major league baseball player.

See also

1948 Cleveland Indians season

References

External links

Retrosheet
SABR project

1918 births
2018 deaths
St. Louis Browns players
Major League Baseball first basemen
United States Army Air Forces personnel of World War II
Baseball players from New Mexico
United States Army Air Forces soldiers
Military personnel from New Mexico
Williamston Martins players
People from Colfax County, New Mexico
Amarillo Gold Sox players
Hollywood Stars players
Johnstown Johnnies players
Sacramento Solons players
San Antonio Missions players
San Francisco Seals (baseball) players
Springfield Browns players
Toledo Mud Hens players
Long Beach Polytechnic High School alumni